Algeria made its Paralympic Games début at the 1992 Summer Paralympics in Barcelona, sending two competitors in athletics, and a goalball team. The country has taken part in every edition of the Summer Paralympics since then, but has never participated in the Winter Paralympics.

Algerians have won a total of 38 medals at the Paralympic Games, of which 15 gold, 7 silver and 16 bronze. Mohamed Allek won Algeria's first two gold medals at the 1996 Games, in the men's 100m and 200m sprints, T36 category. He won three more gold medals, also in sprinting, in 2000. In 2004, his only medal was a bronze, while five other Algerian athletes won a total of seven gold medals: Karim Betina in the men's shot put (F32); Sofia Djelal in the women's discus and javelin (F56-58); Nadia Medjemedj in the women's shot put (F56-58); Samir Nouioua in the men's 1,500m and 5,000m in athletics (T46); and Messaoud Nine in judo (men's up to 90 kg). In 2008, Karim Betina again took a gold in the shot put, as did Kamel Kardjena, while Sid Ali Lamri and Messaoud Nine took a gold medal each in judo.

Medals

Medals by Summer Games

Medals by Winter Games

Medals by Summer Sport

Medals by Winter Sport

By detail 

<small>* There is one man competitor who participate in Athletics and Goalball, so number of men competitors is 26 not 27.</small>

 Athletes with most medals 
The Algerian athlete who won the most medals in the history of the Paralympic Games, is the Paralympian athlete Samir Nouioua.

Notes: in Khaki the athletes still in activity.

 List of medalists 

 World and Paralympic records set at the Summer Paralympics 

Athletics

See also
 :Category:Paralympic competitors for Algeria
 Algeria at the Olympics
 Algeria at the African Games
 Algeria at the Mediterranean Games
 Algeria at the Pan Arab Games

References

External links

Algerian National Paralympic Committee - Official website of the Paralympic MovementAlgerian paralympic medals - Algerian Olympic Committee official website''